Lee Township, Arkansas may refer to:

 Lee Township, Boone County, Arkansas
 Lee Township, Cleveland County, Arkansas
 Lee Township, Johnson County, Arkansas
 Lee Township, Pope County, Arkansas

See also 
 List of townships in Arkansas
 Lee Township (disambiguation)

Arkansas township disambiguation pages